Woman's World is a 1967 war film directed by Alexey Saltykov. The film was a box-office leader in the USSR in the year 1968, fourth place  49.6 million viewers.

Plot
The film is about a simple female kolkhoz farmer, who heads the women of the village during the war and the horror of the Nazi occupation which deprives her of her son, her husband and her home ...

Cast
Rimma Markova as Nadezhda Petrovna
Nina Sazonova as Anna Sergeevna
Alexandra Dorokhin as Marina, wife of Jean
Svetlana Sukhovey as Dunyasha Noskova
Valentina Stolbova as Sophia, the wife of Basil
Svetlana Zhgun as Nastya
Vitaly Solomin as Kostya Lubentsov
Aleksei Krychenkov as Kolya, son of Nadezhda Petrovna
 Aleksandr Grave as store manager
 Fyodor Odinokov as Vasily Petrichenko	
 Yefim Kopelyan as Nazi  commandant Caspar

Awards
VKF (All-Union Film Festival)
1970 — Diploma and Award for Best Actress (Rimma Markova)
San Sebastián International Film Festival
1968 — Special Diploma for Best Actress (Rimma Markova)

References

External links
 

Soviet war drama films
1960s war drama films
Mosfilm films
Films directed by Alexey Saltykov
Films based on works by Yuri Nagibin
1967 drama films
1967 films
1960s Russian-language films